Theloderma rhododiscus is a species of frog in the family Rhacophoridae.
It is found in China and Vietnam.
Its natural habitats are subtropical or tropical moist lowland forests, subtropical or tropical moist montane forests, freshwater marshes, and intermittent freshwater marshes.
It is threatened by habitat loss.

References

rhododiscus
Amphibians of China
Amphibians of Vietnam
Taxonomy articles created by Polbot
Amphibians described in 1962